Oleg Vladimirovich Kashin (born 17 June 1980) is a Russian journalist and writer known for his political articles.

Early life 
Oleg Vladimirovich Kashin was born 17 June 1980 in Kaliningrad.

In March 2003, he graduated from the Baltic Fishing Fleet State Academy in Kaliningrad with a degree a maritime navigation. Kashin sailed twice to sea on a sailing ship Kruzenshtern, being a deck hand and a navigator intern. Participant in international sailing regatta.

Career
While studying at the Baltic State Fishing Fleet Academy, Kashin wrote for Komsomolskaya Pravda in Kaliningrad where he expressed rather sharp views. He continued to work for that newspaper up to 2003, specializing on exclusive interviews and special reports, then moved to Moscow and started working as a journalist for Komsomolskaya Pravda in Moscow. After a while, he left the newspaper, became a staff writer at Kommersant and became the leading Russian journalist covering youth political movements, ranging broadly from the National Bolshevik Party to Nashi. He left Kommersant in June 2005, dissatisfied with the dismissal of the director-general Andrei Vassiliev.

In 2007, Kashin became a regular author and a deputy editor of the Ŗusskaya zhizn (The Russian Life) magazine. In 2009, Kashin returned to Kommersant as a special correspondent.

2010 attack

On 6 November 2010, Kashin was assaulted by unknown attackers near his home in Moscow. He was hospitalized with broken jaw, fractured skull, broken leg and broken fingers, one of which later had to be amputated. Police are treating the attack as attempted murder. President Medvedev said that the assailants "must be found and punished". Prior to the attack, Kashin had been reporting on the proposal to build a highway through the Khimki Forest near Moscow.  His reporting covering youth political movements and political protests had also prompted aggressive responses from many pro-Kremlin groups, including the Young Guard of United Russia, a youth group associated with the United Russia political party, chaired by Vladimir Putin. This attack is one of the subjects of the 2012 documentary Putin's Kiss.

In 2015, Kashin got acquainted with the materials of the investigation, including the testimony of the suspects, and accused Andrey Turchak of ordering the crime. This was done as a revenge for a blog post, which Turchak, then a Pskov Governor, commented on with the words "You have 24 hours to apologize. The countdown has begun." No charges were officially filed against Turchak. In 2017, he was appointed deputy chairman of the State Duma, and Putin awarded him with the Order "For Merit to the Fatherland", 2nd degree. On 27 November 2018, a full video of the interrogation of the alleged perpetrator was published, in which he said that the attack was organized by the co-owner of the "Mechanical Plant" company Alexander Gorbunov, and the customer was Turchak, who personally hurried the performers and personally demanded to break Kashin’s legs and arms so that he could not write.

Views
Considering the widely publicized case of Andrey Sychev, in which a young conscript lost his legs and genitalia after brutal beating by other servicemen, Kashin claimed that the case was fabricated by Committee of Soldiers Mothers: "The only proven episode... is that Sychev squatted for a while in front of now imprisoned junior sergeant Sivyakov.... All the other stuff was thought up by the chairman of Chelyabinsk Committee of Soldiers Mothers Lydmila Zinchenko, who, after giving a dozen of interviews to liberal media now cowardly conceals from investigators."

In 2014, without denying that the annexation of Crimea by the Russian Federation was illegal, Kashin called it a restoration of historical justice. He has been covering the 2014 events in Crimea and the War in Donbass for the influential Russian nationalist publication Sputnik i Pogrom.

Despite taking a strong anti-war stance and describing the actions of the Russian authorities as cannibalistic toward Ukraine and suicidal for Russia itself, he was included by Alexei Navalny's associates on a list of about 6,000 Russian "bribetakers and warmongers" who deserve to fall under international sanctions because of the Russian invasion of Ukraine. Kashin himself linked his inclusion on the list to the fact that he "has repeatedly criticized people who are now speaking on behalf of Navalny."

In popular culture 
A heavily fictionalised version of Kashin played by Yevgeny Stychkin appears as one of the protagonists in the Russian journalistic procedural mini-series Just Imagine Things We Know.

References and notes

External links

Oleg Kashin's blog in LiveJournal
Sticks and stones: the blogs of Oleg Kashin, feature on Kashin
Analysis: Walking With Putin, Radio Free Europe.
Nashi Beats Yabloko Leader, St Petersburg Times.
 

1980 births
Living people
People from Kaliningrad
Russian journalists
Russian dissidents
Russian nationalists
2011–2013 Russian protests
Russian victims of crime
Russian emigrants to Switzerland
Russian emigrants to the United Kingdom
Russian bloggers
Russian columnists
People listed in Russia as media foreign agents